H. Jayatilake Podinilame (1947/48 – 28 April 2013) was a Sri Lankan politician who served as the 3rd Chief Minister of Sabaragamuwa. He was appointed in March 1993 succeeding Abeyratne Pilapitiya and was Chief Minister until June 1998. He was succeeded by Kantha Gunatilleke after a period of vacancy.

Podinilame also served as the Minister of Industries, Trade and Transport in 1991. He was also the Northwestern Development Minister of the UNP Government in 2000. In 2010 left the United National Party and joined the United People’s Freedom Alliance supporting the President’s programme and served as a Deputy Chairman of the Sabaragamuwa Provincial Council until 2012.

References

Members of the Sabaragamuwa Provincial Council
Chief Ministers of Sabaragamuwa Province
1947 births
2013 deaths